Charuymaq-e Jonubegharbi Rural District is in the Central District of Charuymaq County, East Azerbaijan province, Iran. At the National Census of 2006, its population was 4,358 in 783 households. There were 3,881 inhabitants in 1,028 households at the following census of 2011. At the most recent census of 2016, the population of the rural district was 3,496 in 1,048 households. The largest of its 38 villages was Gowijeh Qaleh, with 534 people.

References 

Charuymaq County

Rural Districts of East Azerbaijan Province

Populated places in East Azerbaijan Province

Populated places in Charuymaq County